

Friedrich Freiherr von Broich (1 January 1896 – 24 September 1974) was a German general during World War II.

Shortly before the beginning of the Second World War, then-Major Broich was placed in command of the 34th Aufklärungsabteilung (Reconnaissance Battalion). In December 1939 Broich took over command of the 21st Cavalry Regiment, which he led during the 1940 campaign in France. After promotion to colonel on 1 September 1940, Broich became commander of the 22nd Cavalry Regiment. During the 1941 Russian campaign Broich commanded the 1st Ritter-Regiment and then on 1 December 1941 took over the 24th Rifle Brigade, which was later converted into a Panzer Grenadier brigade. In November 1942 Broich was appointed to lead the first "Broich" division in the North African theater. In February 1943 Broich was appointed commander of the 10th Panzer Division and promoted to major general.

On 12 May 1943, Broich surrendered to the British Army at Grombalia, Tunisia, along with the remnants of the 10th Panzer Division. He was detained at the Trent Park General Officer's POW Camp for the duration of the war. On 1 June 1943 he was promoted to lieutenant general. On October 7, 1947, Broich was repatriated.

Awards

 German Cross in Gold on 2 November 1941 as Oberst in Regiment 22
 Knight's Cross of the Iron Cross on 29 August 1942 as Oberst and commander of the 24. Panzergrenadier-Brigade

References

Citations

Bibliography

 
 

1896 births
1974 deaths
Military personnel from Strasbourg
People from Alsace-Lorraine
German Army personnel of World War I
Lieutenant generals of the German Army (Wehrmacht)
Recipients of the Gold German Cross
Recipients of the clasp to the Iron Cross, 1st class
Recipients of the Knight's Cross of the Iron Cross
Recipients of the Silver Medal of Military Valor